Dyschirius lgockii is a species of ground beetle in the subfamily Scaritinae. It was described by A. Fleischer in 1912.

References

lgockii
Beetles described in 1912